Kuhsee is a lake in Augsburg-Hochzoll-Süd, Swabia, Bavaria, Germany. Its surface area is ca. 17 ha.

Lakes of Bavaria